The 1895 Lafayette football team represented Lafayette College in the 1895 college football season. Lafayette finished with a 6–2 record in their first year under head coach Parke H. Davis. Significant games included victories over Cornell (6–0) and Lehigh (22–12 and 14–6), and losses to Princeton (0–14) and Penn (0–30).  The 1895 Lafayette team outscored its opponents by a combined total of 162 to 62. Lafayette won the 1895 Middle States League championship. No Lafayette players received recognition on the 1895 College Football All-America Team.

Schedule

References

Lafayette
Lafayette Leopards football seasons
Lafayette football